João Pedro Gomes Camacho (born 23 June 1994) is a Portuguese professional footballer who plays for Moreirense F.C. as a right winger.

Club career
Born in Funchal, Madeira, Camacho joined local C.D. Nacional's youth system in 2007 at the age of 13, from neighbouring C.F. União. He made his debut in the Primeira Liga on 12 April 2014, coming on as a late substitute in a 2−0 home win against C.S. Marítimo.

Camacho was rarely played over the course of three top-flight seasons, and in late January 2016 he was loaned to Spanish Segunda División B club SD Compostela. In the following summer he joined another third-tier team, Celta de Vigo B, also on loan.

References

External links

Portuguese League profile 

1994 births
Living people
Sportspeople from Funchal
Portuguese footballers
Madeiran footballers
Association football wingers
Primeira Liga players
Liga Portugal 2 players
C.D. Nacional players
Moreirense F.C. players
Segunda División B players
SD Compostela footballers
Celta de Vigo B players
Portuguese expatriate footballers
Expatriate footballers in Spain
Portuguese expatriate sportspeople in Spain